Samori Toure may refer to:
 Samori Ture (1828–1900), Muslim cleric, military strategist, and founder and leader of the Wassoulou Empire
 Samori Toure (American football) (born 1998), American football wide receiver